Destined is a 2016 American fantasy drama film written and directed by Qasim Basir and starring Cory Hardrict, Hill Harper, La La Anthony and Jesse Metcalfe.

Cast
Cory Hardrict as Sheed / Rasheed
Jesse Metcalfe as Officer Holder / Dylan Holder
Robert Christopher Riley as Cal / Calvin
Margot Bingham as Maya
La La Anthony as Jada
Hill Harper as Mayor Jones
Jason Dohring as Nathan Miller/Officer Miller
Zulay Henao as Giselle Porter

Reception
The film has a 33% rating on Rotten Tomatoes.

References

External links
 
 

American fantasy drama films
2010s English-language films
Hood films
2010s American films